Frederick George Stambrook (November 16, 1929 – July 15, 2005) was a president of the Manitoba Soccer Association and the Canadian Soccer Association.

He moved to England as a refugee at the age of nine where he lived and studied, achieving a B.A. Honours from Oxford University and a PHD from the University of London. Later he moved to Australia and then to Winnipeg, where he became involved in his son's soccer program at the Crescentwood Community Centre, leading to his founding of the Manitoba Minor Soccer Association. He moved on to become president of the Canadian Youth Soccer Association and in 1980 president of the Manitoba Soccer Association. In 1986, he became the 27th president of the Canadian Soccer Association and during his six years in this post contributed to the game in Canada and abroad.

He was the Host-President of the FIFA U-17 World Tournament in Toronto in 1987, an active proponent of women's soccer and helped found the national women's team. He served on the FIFA Appeals Committee at the Los Angeles Olympics and the 1994 World Cup.

He was made a Life Member of the CSA, and was inducted into the Manitoba Jewish Sports Hall of Fame and the Manitoba Sports Hall of Fame. He gave over three decades of service to soccer and at the same time, to his University, where he was a popular professor of history.

He died on July 15, 2005, and in April 2006 he was inducted as a Builder into the Canadian Soccer Hall of Fame.

References

External links
Canadian Soccer Hall of Fame inductee page

1929 births
2005 deaths
Alumni of the University of Oxford
Alumni of the London School of Economics
Jewish emigrants from Austria to the United Kingdom after the Anschluss
Sportspeople from Winnipeg
Jewish Canadian sportspeople
Canadian people of Austrian-Jewish descent
Soccer people from Manitoba
Canadian sports builders
English emigrants to Canada
Canada Soccer Hall of Fame inductees
Presidents of the Canadian Soccer Association